Jeffrey Peter Brisbane (22 October 1924 – 17 January 2002) was an  Australian rules footballer who played with Geelong in the Victorian Football League (VFL).

Personal life
Brisbane served as a sub-lieutenant in the Royal Australian Navy during the Second World War.

Notes

External links 

1924 births
2002 deaths
Australian rules footballers from Victoria (Australia)
Geelong Football Club players
People educated at Geelong Grammar School
Royal Australian Navy personnel of World War II
Royal Australian Navy officers